Duke of Cumberland and Teviotdale was a title in the Peerage of Great Britain that was held by junior members of the British royal family. It was named after the county of Cumberland in England, and after Teviotdale in Scotland. Held by the Hanoverian royals, it was suspended under the Titles Deprivation Act 1917, which revoked titles belonging to enemies of the United Kingdom during the Great War.

History
The title Duke of Cumberland had been created three times in the Peerages of England and Great Britain.

In 1799 the double dukedom of Cumberland and Teviotdale, in the Peerage of Great Britain, was bestowed on Ernest Augustus (later King of Hanover), fifth son of King George III of the United Kingdom. In 1837 Ernest became king of Hanover, and on his death in 1851 the title descended with the kingdom to his son King George V, and on George's death in 1878 to his grandson Prince Ernest Augustus, Crown Prince of Hanover. In 1866 Hanover was annexed by Prussia, but King George died without renouncing his rights. His son Ernest, while maintaining his claim to the kingdom of Hanover, was generally known by his title of Duke of Cumberland in Britain.

The title was suspended for Ernest's pro-German activities during World War I under the Titles Deprivation Act 1917, as it was for his son. Under the Act, the lineal male heirs of the 3rd Duke of Cumberland and Teviotdale have the right to petition the British Crown for the restoration of his peerages. To date, none has done so. The present heir is Prince Ernst August of Hanover (born 26 February 1954), great grandson of the 3rd Duke and current head of the House of Hanover. He is the senior male-line descendant of George III of the United Kingdom.

Dukes of Cumberland and Teviotdale
After the Union of Great Britain, the Hanoverian kings liked to grant double titles (one from one constituent country, one from another) to emphasise unity.

| Prince Ernest AugustusHouse of Hanover1799–1851also: Earl of Armagh (1799) ||  || 5 June 1771Buckingham Palaceson of King George III and Queen Charlotte || Duchess Frederica of Mecklenburg-Strelitz18153 children || 18 November 1851Hanoveraged 80
|-
| Prince GeorgeHouse of Hanover1851–1878also: Earl of Armagh (1799) ||  || 27 May 1819Berlinson of Prince Ernest Augustus and Princess Frederica || Princess Marie of Saxe-Altenburg18433 children || 12 June 1878Parisaged 59
|-
| Prince Ernest AugustusHouse of Hanover1878–1919also: Earl of Armagh (1799) ||  || 21 September 1845Hanoverson of Prince George and Princess Marie || Princess Thyra of Denmark18786 children || 14 November 1923Gmundenaged 78

|}
The Titles Deprivation Act 1917 suspended the title on 28 March 1919.

See also
King of Hanover

References

1799 establishments in England
 
Noble titles created in 1799